LLLC may be an abbreviation for:

 La Leche League Canada
 Lafayette Library and Learning Center
 Lifelong learning centre
 Low-profit limited liability company

See also

 
 LCCC (disambiguation)
 L3C (disambiguation)
 LC (disambiguation)